Tanz in der Galerie is an East German film. It was released in 1957.

External links
 

1957 films
East German films
1950s German-language films
Films directed by Gottfried Kolditz
1950s German films